Khalij Fars ("Persian Gulf") is an Iranian single-stage solid-propellant, supersonic anti-ship quasi ballistic missile with a range of 300 km based on the Fateh-110 missile. It is equipped with a 650 kg explosive warhead and an interception evading guidance system.

The missile was unveiled in February 2011 when the Commander of the Islamic Revolutionary Guards Corps, Major General Mohammad Ali Jafari, announced that it is being mass-produced. The Iranian Fars News Agency released a footage of the missile hitting a target ship successfully. The missile was first tested during the Great Prophet III naval wargames in 2008.

There have been two other publicized tests of the missile. One occurred in July 2011 and the other in July 2012. The latter test also showed footage taken by the missile's electro-optical seeker locked onto its target.

Features and capabilities 

It is a single-stage, solid-fuel-propelled vehicle, and is equipped with a  explosive warhead that uses a combination of guidance systems to prevent interception. The Persian Gulf has an advanced electronic system that allows the missile to discover and navigate to the target. The missile relies on its own internal navigation system, allowing it to travel without radio interference.

Comparable systems 
 Fateh-110
 LORA
 Tochka
 Hadès
 Nasr
 Oka
 Iskander

See also 
 Fateh-110
 Armed Forces of the Islamic Republic of Iran
 Aerospace Force of the Army of the Guardians of the Islamic Revolution
 Equipment of the Iranian Army
 Defense industry of Iran
 List of military equipment manufactured in Iran
 Science and technology in Iran
 Great Prophet III (military exercise)
 Great Prophet IX
 Kheibarshekan

References

External links
 Pictures of missile being fired.

Anti-ship missiles of Iran
Ballistic missiles of Iran
Weapons and ammunition introduced in 2011
Surface-to-surface missiles of Iran
Short-range ballistic missiles of Iran
Theatre ballistic missiles